Sand Creek Massacre National Historic Site is a National Historic Site in Kiowa County, Colorado, commemorating the Sand Creek Massacre that occurred here on November 29, 1864. The site is considered sacred after the unprovoked assault on an encampment of approximately 750 Native people resulted in the murder of hundreds of men, women and children. A few basic park facilities have been opened at this site.

In 1999, archaeological teams from the National Park Service, Dept. of the Interior BLM, Colorado Historical Society and accompanied by Native American observers, made a major archaeological discovery of remains of the massacre site. Large numbers of period bullets, camp equipment, and other items convinced the NPS that they had found the correct site.

The Historical Site was authorized by Public Law 106-465 on November 7, 2000, in order to "recognize the national significance of the massacre in American history, and its ongoing significance to the Cheyenne and Arapaho people and the descendants of the massacre victims."  The law authorized establishment of the site once the National Park Service acquired sufficient land from willing sellers to preserve, commemorate, and interpret the massacre. The site near the junction of County Road 54 and County Road "W" was listed on the National Register of Historic Places on September 28, 2001. The site contains a small visitor center, interpretive plaques and signage, monuments located on a hilltop overlooking the massacre site, and two walking trails.  The massacre site itself is off-limits to visitors. 

On August 2, 2005, President George W. Bush gave final approval for the site. On April 23, 2007 it was announced that site would become America's 391st official park unit with an effective date of April 27, 2007. The dedication ceremony was held on April 28, 2007. In October 2022, leaders from the Northern Arapaho Tribe, the Northern Cheyenne Tribe, the Cheyenne and Arapaho Tribes along with descendants of some of the massacre’s victims and survivors joined Secretary of the Interior Deb Haaland at the site as she announced the  purchase of an additional . The area included lands listed on the National Register of Historic Places for their significance. Archaeological remains include evidence of the village where Cheyenne and Arapaho families were camped, along with an intact viewshed that is key to the integrity of the site. The expansion of the site contributed to one of the most intact shortgrass prairie ecosystems within the National Park system, providing habitat for a wide range of plants, wildlife and species of special concern.

By 2004 the federal government acquired  from private land owners. The site includes  acquired and preserved by the American Battlefield Trust and its partners.

References

External links 

Sand Creek Massacre Site National Register of Historic Places
 Sand Creek Massacre National Historic Site – National Park Service
 The Conservation Fund – Sand Creek Massacre National Historic Site

Massacres of Native Americans
National Historic Sites in Colorado
Protected areas established in 2007
Protected areas of Kiowa County, Colorado
Conflict sites on the National Register of Historic Places in Colorado
2007 establishments in Colorado
Grasslands of Colorado